The 1977 Florida Gators football team represented the University of Florida during the 1977 NCAA Division I football season. The season was Doug Dickey's eighth as the head coach of the Florida Gators football team.  Dickey's 1977 Florida Gators finished with a 6–4–1 overall record and a 3–3 Southeastern Conference (SEC) record, placing fifth among ten SEC teams.

Before the season
Florida had several quarterbacks, with Terry LeCount starting.

Schedule

Primary source: 2016 Florida Gators Football Media Guide

Attendance figures: 1978 University of Florida Press Guide.

Roster

Other: Tim Aydp

Game summaries

Rice

Florida opened the season in Houston with a non-conference game against Rice. Former all-conference safety Terry LeCount started at quarterback in the Gators' wishbone offense, but the most notable play at the position came in the 4th quarter, when third-string freshman Cris Collinsworth tossed an NCAA record 99-yard touchdown pass to Derrick Gaffney on his first collegiate attempt.

Mississippi State
In the second week of play, Florida edged Mississippi State 24–22.yepremian junior kicker comes through  again keeping Florids hopes alive

LSU
Louisiana State beat Florida 36–14. Wes Chandler had 146 yards receiving, including an 85-yard reception from Terry LeCount.

Pittsburgh

Florida and Pitt tied 17–17.

Tennessee

The Gators called a timeout in the final seconds of a 27–17 win over the Tennessee Volunteers. Tennessee coach Johnny Majors was furious, and the post-game handshake ritual  became a shoving match between coaching staffs.

Auburn
The Auburn Tigers upset Florida 29–14.

Georgia

    
    
    
    
    
    
    

The Gators beat rival Georgia 22–17.

Kentucky
The seventh-ranked Kentucky Wildcats defeated Florida 14–7.

Utah

    
    
    
    
    
    
    
    
    
    
        

The Gators ran over the Utah Utes for 531 yards and won 38–29.

Miami (FL)

    
    
    
    
    
    
    

Florida defeated the Miami Hurricanes 31–14.

Florida State

    

    
     

    

Bobby Bowden got his first win over the Gators, as Florida State beat Florida 37–9.

Postseason
Four Gators made All-SEC.

References

External links
 Florida State game

Florida
Florida Gators football seasons
Florida Gators football